Florence Dissent, known later as Mrs. Dissent Barnes, (born July 9, 1869) was an Anglo-Indian medical practitioner and surgeon. Dissent was among the first female Indian doctors to practice medicine.

Early life and education 
Dissent was born in Calcutta, India. She was educated at home until the age of eight. She then became a day-pupil at Loreto Convent, where she stayed until the age of 14.

Dissent received her doctor of medicine (MD) from Brussels. She was licensed through the Triple Qualification from the Scottish medical and surgical colleges: the Royal College of Physicians of Edinburgh, the Royal College of Surgeons of Edinburgh, and Royal College of Physicians and Surgeons of Glasgow.

Medical career 
After qualifying in medicine, Dissent worked at the Dufferin Hospital in Allahbad under a Dr. McConaghey. The Dufferin staff, in 1892, consisted of Dissent, two male European surgeons, ten nurses, a midwife, a dresser, a compounder, and a matron. Dissent was attached to the Dufferin Fund and later the Women's Medical Service for India.

Dissent's work was published at least three times during her career. In 1891,the Indian Medical Gazette published a gynecological case study from her practice at Allahbad. In that study, Dissent describes two cases of uterine polyps in her patients, detailing the medical history, symptoms, and treatments of each patient. In 1892, Dissent's notes on the Dufferin Hospital were published in Indian Medical Gazette. Here, it was noted that Dissent herself performed 30 major operations from January to August 1892, ranging from cataract operations to obstetrics and gynecology and plastics. In the same time, Dufferin Hospital saw more than 100 minor cases per month. In these publications, Dissent's title is 'Miss' because she practiced as a surgeon. Throughout her career, Florence published under both Miss Dissent and Mrs. Dissent Barnes. 

In 1895, the Indian Medical Record published a full-page biographical sketch of Dissent. She was held up as a role model to encourage women to enter medicine. The article implored Indian woman to become medical practitioners particularly for the sake of treating the zenanas, who could not be seen by male doctors.

By 1912, Dissent had married and moved to Bhopal, India. In February of 1912, Dissent, now known as Mrs. Dissent Barnes, was visited by Sidney and Beatrice Webb during their travels. The Webbs noted the prevalence of syphilis in the area and were taken to see Dissent's hospital, which treated only women and children. Dissent had also been charged by the Begum of Bhopal, Sultan Jahan, to train the native midwives. These midwives (dais) were prevented from practicing if they had not taken a course by Dissent or if they had been suspended by her.

In 1922, Dissent was employed to the Government of Bombay to inquire into the maternity conditions of industrial women workers. A year later, her report on the subject was published in the Bombay Labour Gazette.

References 

1869 births
Date of death missing
Anglo-Indian people
Indian surgeons
Women surgeons